The Berry Creek Rancheria of Maidu Indians of California are a Native American people based in northeastern California, south of Lassen Peak. They historical have spoken the Konkow language, also known as Northeastern Maidu.

They are a federally recognized Maidu tribe, headquartered in Oroville in Butte County.

Reservation 
The tribe has 304 enrolled members; 136 of whom live on the reservation.

Government 
The tribe is managed by an elected tribal council. They hold elections every four years. Their current tribal chairman is Francis Steele.

Enrollment 
The tribe has approximately 304 enrolled citizens. The reservation population is approximately 136.

Education
The ranchería is served by the Pioneer Union Elementary School District and Oroville Union High School District.

Notable Berry Creek Rancheria members
Frank Day (1902–1976), artist

See also
 List of Indian reservations in the United States

References

External links
 Berry Creek Rancheria of Maidu Indians of California, official website

Maidu
Native American tribes in California
Federally recognized tribes in the United States
Butte County, California